The Pilatapa (or Pirlatapa, Birladapa, or Biladaba) were an Indigenous people of South Australia, now extinct.

Country
On the northwest they lived also around northwest to what is now the Strzelecki Desert Lakes encompassing Lake Blanche and Blanchewater. He placed their eastern extension at east to Callabonna approximately to the vicinity of Tilcha, while their southern boundaries were around Wooltana and Hamilton Creek.

Language
Their language, Pilatapa, was closely related to the Diyari language.

Social organisation and customs
Samuel Gason's account of the Pilatapa is integrated into a general description of the Diyari, Ngameni, Yandruwandha and Yauraworka.
Male initiation rites involved circumcision, but excluded subincision.

Alternative names
 Pidlatapa
 Piladapa, Pilladapa, Pillitapa
 Billidapa
 Pulladapa
 Berluppa
 Pilliapp
 Jarikuna. (Wailpi pejorative exonym).
 Yarrikuna

Notes

Citations

Sources

Aboriginal peoples of South Australia